Sir John Crompton was an English politician who sat in the House of Commons from 1614 to 1622.

Crompton was possibly the son of Sir Thomas Crompton MP for Radnor.  He was knighted at Newmarket on 25 March 1608. In 1614, he was elected Member of Parliament for Brecon.  He was elected MP for Eye  in 1621.

References

Year of birth missing
Year of death missing
Members of the Parliament of England (pre-1707) for constituencies in Wales
English MPs 1621–1622
English MPs 1614